Tombo can refer to:
Tombo (Registry) a Portuguese registry for land and royal revenue.
Tombo language, one of the Dogon languages.
 A character of that name in Kiki's Delivery Service
The Japanese word for dragonfly, とんぼ.
Tombo Ahi a Japanese name for albacore tuna (Thunnus alalunga) which references the fish's dragonfly-like, long pectoral fins.
Tombo, Sierra Leone
 Tombo (album)
Rudolf Tombo Jr. (1875-1914), American philologist